The Queensland Country Women's Association (QCWA) is the Queensland chapter of the Country Women's Association in Australia. The association seeks to serve the interests of women and children in rural areas in Australia through a network of local branches. Established in 1922, local branches provide friendship and mutual support to their members while contributing to the betterment of life in their local communities. Over time, many branches have evolved to include support for wider issues such as domestic violence campaigns and fund-raising for international initiatives such as orphanages.

In 2019 the QWCA received a Queensland Greats Award from the Queensland Government.

History 

On 8–11 August 1922, the Brisbane Women's Club held an open conference for countrywomen in Brisbane's Albert Hall during the Exhibition (a time when many country people visited Brisbane). The conference was opened by Lady Forster, wife of Australian Governor-General and the Queensland Governor Matthew Nathan attended. On 11 August 1922, the outcome of the conference was to establish the Queensland Country Women's Association. Ruth Beatrice Fairfax was elected the first President.

The first meeting of the Toowoomba branch was held at the Toowoomba Town Hall on 12 September 1922. Ruth Fairfax attended and spoke about the objectives of the organisation. The meeting resolved to hold a conference as soon as there were sufficient representatives to attend.

The objectives of the association were broad but included some specific items:
1. To improve welfare and conditions of women and children in the country
2. To draw together all women, girls, and children in Country Districts.
3. To bring opportunities for recreation and enjoyment within reach of all Members.
4. To encourage the active study of Local, Municipal and State affairs and to promote a wise and kindly spirit.
5. To improve educational facilities in the Country.
6. To secure better provision for the safeguarding of Public Health especially of children, and the securing of more adequate Medical and Hospital facilities for Country Districts.

There was a call for a design for a badge and the winner was Mrs Mabel Chandler of Burra Burri who proposed the letters CWA within a large letter "Q"; this design is still used as the organisation's logo. It was decided that the silver and royal blue should be adopted as the colours for the organisation. Many QCWA buildings or 'rest rooms' are painted royal blue and white to approximate the chosen colours.

In the 1930s the association held the motto With loyalty to the Throne, service to the country, through country women, by country women, for country women.  By 1950 this was given as Honour to God, Loyalty to the Throne, Service to the country, Through country women, By country women, For country women.

A creed was also made:
I would be true, for there are those who trust me; I would be pure, for there are those who care; I would be strong for there is much to suffer; I would be brave, for there is much to dare.
I would be friend to all—the foe—the friendless; I would be giving and forget the gift; I would be humble, for I know my weakness; I would look up—and laugh—and love—and lift.

Branches were grouped within a division, within the State body.  Western Division included Roma and Trenhed.  The Southern Region was rearranged by 1945 to form new divisions such as the Gympie and South Burnett.  The new Maranoa Division looked after 29 branches including Dalby and Wandoan.

Queensland's Younger Sets were formed by April 1928 in Warwick, with the QCWA Bundaberg Younger Set established in mid-2008.  Membership is for girls and women up to 25 years-of-age, although one set in 1930 allowed 'any girl or unmarried woman' as eligible for membership.

In 2012 the QWC celebrated its 90th birthday.

The Queensland chapter was inducted into the Queensland Business Leaders Hall of Fame in 2013.

In 2017 the QWCA created its own perfume, '1922', to mark its 95th anniversary. It was released at 2017 Ekka and was developed by Damask Perfumery in Brisbane. The artwork and branding of the bottle was supplied by Brisbane watercolour artist Michelle Grayson.

In 2019 the QWCA received a Queensland Greats Award from the Queensland Government.

In 2022 the QCWA celebrated their centenary year.  As part of the celebrations, in early February, the Perth Mint launched a $1 coin commemorating the centenary in Queensland and New South Wales.  Other intended events were ongoing displays celebrating the achievements of early members, and attending Parliament House and raising concerns affecting women and families across Queensland.

Branches 

As at December 2018, the QWCA had over 240 branches throughout Queensland. The following list includes all branches active in December 2018, and some of the former branches. (Note, if dates of founding and disbanding are not known, dates of known activity/inactivity are used to assist in identifying actual founding/disbanding.)

Homes 

Several CWAs maintained and built houses for the use of visiting members, including:

 Brisbane: 'Linga Longa' seaside home, Lower Esplanade, Sandgate, purchased in 1925 by the Metropolitan Branch. 
'All members of the C.W.A., except those in the Metropolitan area, are eligible to spend a holiday at the home, but preference is always given to Western women and to sick and necessitous cases.'

 Brisbane: 'Lota Cottage' seaside home, Lota, with views to Moreton Bay's islands, was donated by the family as a memorial to a Queensland pioneer, Mrs Mylne, in 1924;
 Dalby: the 'Shack', Mount Mowbullan, Bunya Mountains, from 1928. By 1951, it was proposed to be sold due to the cost to maintain;  It was managed by the Dalby District CWA.
 Gold Coast: holiday cottage, Tamborine Mountain, by 1929;
 Gold Coast: Southport Cottage, owned by the Saint George branch.  The Broad Street building on stilts had four rooms and a sleep-out verandah, originally two cottages on Stradbroke Island, was in use by November 1936, but officially opened in January 1938;
 Redcliffe, obtained by 1923, and the first-ever glimpse of the sea by members and families;
 Townsville: Pioneer Women's Memorial Building seaside huts, Mitchell Street, Kissing Point, Townsville, by 1929.  This included a 'sharkproof' enclosure for swimming;
 Western: a 'tourist shack', Bandana station, Carnarvon Creek, with two bedrooms and three beds in each, a bathroom, kitchen, and laundry tubs.  This was opened in September 1947, and maintained by the Trenhed branch.

Hostels 

At the 1945 State Conference in Brisbane the two following resolutions carried: "That the QCWA adopt a hostel scheme throughout the State," and "Now that the Government has placed certain of the Western hospitals under board control, it would be a comfort to expectant mothers of the West if the Government would include hostels for these waiting mothers in the Hospitals Board scheme."

Locations circa 1934 
 Burnett st., Bundaberg (for boys)
 Herbert st., Goondiwindi
 Stanthorpe
 Albion st., Warwick (for girls)

Locations  circa 1941 
 Burnett st., Bundaberg

 Herbert st., Goondiwindi
 Albion st., Warwick

Locations  circa 1949 

 Alpha
 Gregory Terrace, Brisbane (opened 1943)
 War Memorial Students' Hostel, Richmond Hill, Charters Towers (for boys)
 Herbert st., Goondiwindi
 Mary Tregear Women's Hostel, 84 Limestone st., Ipswich
 Students' Hostel, Brisbane st., Ipswich (for girls)

 Students' Hostel, Milford st., Ipswich (for boys)
 Lockyer Women's Hostel, Laidley
 Shannon House, Eagle st., Longreach
 Mackay
 Archer st., Rockhampton (formerly St Kilda Guest House)
 Roma (for boys)
 Roma (for girls)
 St George
 Stanthorpe (for students)
 The Kathleen Parr Student Hostel, Tambo
 26 Mitchell st., North Ward, Townsville
 Tully

 Palmerin st., Warwick

Locations  circa 1959 
 The Ainsley Templeton Hostel, Alpha
 Ayr (for students)
 Templeton House, Barcaldine Mothers' Hostel, Fir st., Barcaldine
 Callide Valley Hostel, Biloela 
 Margaret Young Mothers Hostel, Blackall
 52 Herbert st., Bowen
 91 Gregory tce., Brisbane
 Galatea st., Charleville
 Prior st., Charters Towers
 1 Annie st., Dalby
 Kirby st., Dirranbandi
 Herbert st., Goondiwindi
 CWA Students' Memorial Hostel, Goondiwindi (for students)
 Channon st., Gympie
 Mowbray St., Hughenden
 5 Brisbane st., Ipswich
 Mary Tregear Women's Hostel, 84 Limestone st., Ipswich
 Byrne st., Julia Creek
 Rose st., Kilcoy
 Lockyer Women's Hostel, William st., Laidley
 Shannon House, Longreach 
 Gordon st., Mackay
 Lloyd st., Mareeba
 Cambridge st., Mitchell
 Monto and District Students' Hostel, Monto
 Isa Street, Mount Isa 
 Muttaburra
 Nambour Students' Jubilee Hostel, Nambour (for students – opened 1951)
 Archer st., Rockhampton
 St George
 Railway st., Stanthorpe
 The Kathleen Parr Student Hostel, Tambo
 Memorial Hostel, Denham st., cnr Walker st., Townsville
 Palmerin st., Warwick
 Winton Mothers' Hostel
 Winton (for students)

Locations  circa 1969 
 Chippendale Street, Ayr
 Blackall
 Herbert Street, Bowen
 Gregory tce., Brisbane
 Galatea Street, Charleville
 Cloncurry
 1 Annie st., Dalby
 Gayndah
 McLean st., Goondiwindi (for students)
 Gympie
 Mowbray St., Hughenden
 Great Road, Inglewood (opened November 1950)
 Mary Tregear Women's Hostel, 84 Limestone st., Ipswich
 5 Brisbane st., Ipswich
 Kilcoy
 Lockyer Women's Hostel, William st., Laidley
 119 Crane Street, Longreach
 115 Kingfisher Street, Longreach
 Gordon st., Mackay
 Isa Street, Mount Isa
 Muttaburra
 Archer st., Rockhampton
 Feather st., Roma
 Victoria Street, Saint George
 Porphyry Street, Springsure
 69 William st., Surat
 Tambo
 Dowling st., Thargomindah
 20 Arthur st., Toowoomba
 Memorial Hostel, Denham st., cnr Walker st., Townsville
 Palmerin st., Warwick
 Winton (for students)

Honours 

On 9 June 2003 in the Queen's Birthday Honours List, Mrs Jean Eva Anderson of Ballater Station at Stamford was awarded the Medal of the Order of Australia for her "service to the community of Hughenden, particularly through the Country Womens Association". She had given 52 years of service to the Hughenden branch. Her award was presented to her by the then Governor of Queensland, Quentin Bryce.

Notes

References

Bibliography 

 —full text available online.

Further reading

External links 

 Queensland Country Women's Association turns 100! 2022, John Oxley Library blog, State Library of Queensland
 Queensland Country Women's Association Digital Stories and Oral History, State Library of Queensland
 Archived official website, Trove, State Library of Queensland
 Queensland Country Women's Association 1962 Photographs, State Library of Queensland
 Tour of Branches of the Northern and Central Divisions by Mrs. Fairfax and Joan White, State Library of Queensland

State Library of Queensland holds the following records:

 Queensland Country Women's Association Records 1923-2002
 Queensland Country Women's Association Records 1926-2008
 Queensland Country Women's Association Records 1923-2010
 Queensland Country Women's Association Minute Books 1924-2013
 and others

1922 establishments in Australia
Organizations established in 1922
Country Women's Association
National Rural Health Alliance organisations